Tlapehuala    is one of the 81 municipalities of Guerrero, in south-western Mexico. The municipal seat lies at Tlapehuala. The municipality covers an area of 266.7 km².

As of 2005, the municipality had a total population of 20,989. 

Former mayor Aurelio Santamaría Bahena, died on February 5, 2021, due to the COVID-19 pandemic in Mexico. As of February 18, there were 191 cases and 21 deaths in the municipality due to the pandemic.

References

Municipalities of Guerrero